Majid Khan may refer to:

Majid Khan, Iran, a village
Majid Khan (cricketer) (born 1946), former Pakistan Test cricketer
Majid Khan (cricketer, born 1989), Pakistani cricketer

Majid Khan (detainee), transferred to Belize in 2023